, commonly called , is a tiny abandoned island off Nagasaki, lying about  from the centre of the city. It is one of 505 uninhabited islands in Nagasaki Prefecture. The island's most notable features are its abandoned concrete buildings, undisturbed except by nature, and the surrounding seawall. While the island is a symbol of the rapid industrialization of Japan, it is also a reminder of Japanese war crimes as a site of forced labour prior to and during World War II.

The  island was known for its undersea coal mines, established in 1887, which operated during the industrialisation of Japan. The island reached a peak population of 5,259 in 1959. In 1974, with the coal reserves nearing depletion, the mine was closed and all of the residents departed soon after, leaving the island effectively abandoned for the following three decades.

Interest in the island re-emerged in the 2000s on account of its undisturbed historic ruins, and it gradually became a tourist attraction. Certain collapsed exterior walls have since been restored, and travel to Hashima was reopened to tourists on April 22, 2009. Increasing interest in the island resulted in an initiative for its protection as a site of industrial heritage. 

The coal mine of the island was formally approved as a UNESCO World Heritage Site in July 2015, as part of Japan's Sites of Japan's Meiji Industrial Revolution: Iron and Steel, Shipbuilding and Coal Mining.

Etymology
Battleship Island is an English translation of the Japanese nickname for Hashima Island, Gunkanjima (gunkan meaning warship, Jima being the rendaku form of Shima, meaning island). The island's nickname came from its resemblance from a distance to the Japanese battleship Tosa.

History

Coal was first discovered on the island around 1810, and the island was continuously inhabited from 1887 to 1974 as a seabed coal mining facility. Mitsubishi Goshi Kaisha bought the island in 1890 and began extracting coal from undersea mines, while seawalls and land reclamation (which tripled the size of the island) were constructed. Four main mine-shafts (reaching up to a kilometre deep) were built, with one actually connecting it to a neighbouring island. Between 1891 and 1974, around 15.7 million tons of coal were excavated in mines with temperatures of 30 °C and 95% humidity.

In 1916, the company built Japan's first large reinforced concrete building (a 7-floor miner's apartment block), to accommodate their burgeoning ranks of workers. Concrete was specifically used to protect against typhoon destruction. Over the next 55 years, more buildings were constructed, including apartment blocks, a school, kindergarten, hospital, town hall, and a community centre. For entertainment, a clubhouse, cinema, communal bath, swimming pool, rooftop gardens, shops, and a pachinko parlour were built for the miners and their families.

Beginning in 1930s and until the end of World War II, conscripted Korean civilians and Chinese prisoners of war were forced to work under very harsh conditions and brutal treatment at the Mitsubishi facility as forced labourers under Japanese wartime mobilisation policies. During this period, many of those conscripted labourers died on the island due to various dangers, including underground accidents, exhaustion, and malnutrition; 137 died by one estimate; about 1300 by another.

In 1959, the  island's population reached its peak of 5,259, with a population density of 835 people per hectare (83,500 people/km2, 216,264 people per square mile) for the whole island, or 1,391 per hectare (139,100 
people/km2) for the residential district.

As petroleum replaced coal in Japan in the 1960s, coal mines began shutting down across the country, and Hashima's mines were no exception. Mitsubishi officially closed the mine in January 1974, and the island was cleared of inhabitants on 20 April.

Today, its most notable features are the abandoned and still mostly-intact concrete apartment buildings, the surrounding seawall, and its distinctive profile shape. The island has been administered as part of Nagasaki city since the merger with the former town of Takashima in 2005. Travel to Hashima was re-opened on 22 April 2009, after 35 years of closure.

Current status

The island was owned by Mitsubishi until 2002, when it was voluntarily transferred to Takashima Town. Currently, Nagasaki City, which absorbed Takashima Town in 2005, exercises jurisdiction over the island. On 23 August 2005, landing was permitted by the city hall to journalists only. At the time, Nagasaki City planned the restoration of a pier for tourist landings in April 2008. In addition a visitor walkway 220 meters (722 feet) in length was planned, and entry to unsafe building areas was to be prohibited. Due to the delay in development construction, however, at the end of 2007, the city announced that public access was delayed until spring 2009. Additionally the city encountered safety concerns, arising from the risk of collapse of the buildings on the island due to significant ageing.

It was estimated that landing of tourists would only be feasible for fewer than 160 days per year because of the area's harsh weather. For reasons of cost-effectiveness, the city considered cancelling plans to extend the visitor walkway further—for an approximate 300 metres (984 feet) toward the eastern part of the island and approximately 190 metres (623 feet) toward the western part of the island—after 2009. A small portion of the island was finally reopened for tourism in 2009, but more than 95% of the island is strictly delineated as off-limits during tours. A full reopening of the island would require substantial investment in safety, and detract from the historical state of the aged buildings on the property.

The island is increasingly gaining international attention not only generally for its modern regional heritage, but also for the undisturbed housing complex remnants representative of the period from the Taishō period to the Shōwa period. It has become a frequent subject of discussion among enthusiasts for ruins. Since the abandoned island has not been maintained, several buildings have collapsed, mainly due to typhoon damage, and other buildings are in danger of collapse. However, some of the collapsed exterior walls have been restored with concrete.

Forced labour

Japan's 2009 request to include Hashima Island, along with 22 other industrial sites, in the UNESCO World Heritage Site list was initially opposed by South Korean authorities on the grounds that Korean and Chinese forced labourers were used on the island prior to and during World War II. North Korea also criticised the World Heritage bid because of this issue.

Although the period at which forced labour took place does not coincide with the period of the Meiji industrial revolution, the criticism arose based on the view that the Meiji industrial revolution was 'inseparable from 20th-century empire-building, which led inexorably to Japanese colonialism and the Asia–Pacific War'. South Korea claimed that the official recognition of those sites would "violate the dignity of the survivors of forced labor as well as the spirit and principles of the UNESCO Convention", and "World Heritage sites should be of outstanding universal value and be acceptable by all peoples across the globe." China also released a similar statement that "World Heritage application should live up to the principle and spirit of promoting peace as upheld by UNESCO."

A week before the beginning of the 39th UNESCO World Heritage Committee (WHC) meeting in Bonn, Germany, South Korea and Japan agreed on a compromise: that Japan would include the use of forced labour in the explanation of facilities in relevant sites and both nations would cooperate towards the approval of each other's World Heritage Site candidates.

In July 2015, during the WHC meeting, South Korea withdrew its opposition after Japan's acknowledgement of this issue as part of the history of the island, specifically noting that "there were a large number of Koreans and others who were brought against their will and forced to work under harsh conditions in the 1940s at some of the sites [including Hashima island]" and that Japan was "prepared to incorporate appropriate measures into the interpretive strategy to remember the victims such as the establishment of information centre". The site was subsequently approved for inclusion on the UNESCO World Heritage list on 5 July as part of the item Sites of Japan's Meiji Industrial Revolution: Iron and Steel, Shipbuilding and Coal Mining.

On the same day immediately after the UNESCO WHC meeting, Japanese Foreign Minister Fumio Kishida publicly explained that "the remarks [forced to work under harsh conditions] by the Japanese government representative did not mean 'forced labor and that "they were requisitioned under the National Requisition Ordinance which was applied to the Korean Peninsula at the time and that, given the nature of the policy of requisition, there were also cases in which they were requisitioned against their will". Responding to this controversy, a South Korean government official said, "If you look at the larger context, it says that they were taken away against their will and 'forced to work' under harsh conditions. No matter how you look at it, the only interpretation is that this was forced labor."
 
A monitoring mechanism for the implementation of 'the measures to remember the victims' was set up by the World Heritage Committee and it was assessed during the WHC Session in June 2018. In this meeting, the UNESCO committee concluded that Japan's effort and progress to implement appropriate measures to commemorate the victims and acknowledge the full history of the island were unsatisfactory and requested Japan to keep their promises.

Access

When people resided on the island, the Nomo Shosen line served the island from Nagasaki Port via Iōjima Island and Takashima Island. Twelve round-trip services were available per day in 1970. It took 50 minutes to travel from the island to Nagasaki. After all residents left the island, this direct route was discontinued.

Since April 2009, the island has been open for public visits, although there are restrictions by Nagasaki city's ordinance.
Sightseeing boat trips around or to the island are currently provided by five operators; Gunkanjima Concierge, Gunkanjima Cruise Co., Ltd., Yamasa-Kaiun, and Takashima Kaijou from Nagasaki Port, and a private service from the Nomozaki Peninsula.

In popular culture

In 2002, Swedish filmmaker Thomas Nordanstad visited the island with Dotokou, a Japanese man who grew up on Hashima. Nordanstad documented the trip in a film called Hashima, Japan, 2002.

During the 2009 Mexican photography festival FotoSeptiembre, Mexican photographers Guillaume Corpart Muller and Jan Smith, along with Venezuelan photographer Ragnar Chacin, showcased images from the island in the exhibition "Pop. Density 5,000/km2". The exhibition traced urban density and the rise and fall of cities around the world.

In 2009, the island was featured in History Channel's Life After People, first-season episode "The Bodies Left Behind" as an example of the decay of concrete buildings after only 35 years of abandonment.

The island was again featured in 2011 in episode six of a 3D production for 3net, Forgotten Planet, discussing the island's current state, history and unauthorised photo shoots by urban explorers. The Japanese Cultural Institute in Mexico used the images of Corpart Muller and Smith in the photography exhibition "Fantasmas de Gunkanjima", organized by Daniela Rubio, as part of the celebrations surrounding 200 years of diplomacy between Mexico and Japan.

The island has appeared in a number of feature films. External shots of the island were used in the 2012 James Bond film Skyfall. The 2015 live-action Japanese films based on the manga Attack on Titan used the island for filming multiple scenes, and 2013 Thai horror film Hashima Project was filmed there. 

The island is depicted in the comic Atomic Robo, where it features prominently as a central location in the storylines of Volume 6: The Ghost of Station X, Volume 10: The Ring of Fire, and Volume 12: The Spectre of Tomorrow.

The 2017 South Korean World War II film The Battleship Island (Korean: 군함도; Hanja: 軍艦島; RR: Gunhamdo), depicts a fictitious attempt by Korean forced labourers to escape the labour camp on the island.

The island appeared in a CNN article entitled "10 of the freakiest places around the world".

See also

 Anti-Japanese sentiment in Korea
 
 Fort Drum (Philippines)
 Desert island
 Lists of islands

References

External links

Studies of the Modern Buildings on Gunkajima 1916-1974 (1986) 
https://en.gunkanjima-excursion.com/

Ghost towns in Japan
Anti-Japanese sentiment in Korea
Empire of Japan
Postwar Japan
Uninhabited islands of Japan
Mitsubishi
Modern ruins
Contemporary archaeology
Islands of Nagasaki Prefecture
World Heritage Sites in Japan
Coal mines in Japan